The Library Window is a short story by the Scottish author Margaret Oliphant. It was first published in Blackwood's Magazine in January 1896. It is a ghost story where the protagonist is fascinated by a window at her aunt's house in which she sees the ghost of a young, murdered writer. It was one of Oliphant's most controversial stories. Modern interpretations consider it a statement of the oppressive conditions for women in the late Victorian period.

References 

1896 short stories
Ghosts in written fiction